Alfred Gerstenberg (6 April 1893 – 1 January 1959, in Bad Tölz) was a German Luftwaffe general. During World War II, he organized a very effective defensive perimeter around oil fields in Ploieşti, Romania.

Career
Gerstenberg began his army service in 1912 in a cavalry unit. During World War I he was sent to the Eastern Front. Later, he was transferred into the air force and flew as an observation aircraft pilot. In 1916, he joined the Richthofen Squadron led by Manfred von Richthofen. In October 1917, his plane was shot down and Gerstenberg suffered a heavy injury. Next year, he returned as a non-flying officer. After the war served in several cavalry units, retiring in 1926. He rejoined the Luftwaffe in 1934 and after 1938 served as Luftwaffe attaché at embassies in Warsaw and Bucharest.

From 15 February 1942 to 27 August 1944, Gerstenberg served as the commanding general of Luftwaffe in Romania (Kommandierender General und Befehlshaber der Deutschen Luftwaffe in Rumänien). His most important task was to set up a defense zone around the oil refineries in Ploieşti, the largest single source of oil for Nazi Germany. He managed to create an effective anti-aircraft defense system against air attacks. He commanded around 25,000 men in Ploieşti and 11,000 near Bucharest. As a result, the first massive air attack on the fields on 1 August 1943 (US Air Force operation Tidal Wave) failed to knock out the oil production and suffered heavy losses.

When Romania switched sides during World War II, (23 August 1944) Gerstenberg, with 4,000 men, entered Bucharest trying to occupy its key points. This attempt failed and his troops were encircled, in spite of Brandenburgers paratroopers dropped in as a support. On 28 August, he surrendered to the Soviets and was kept in captivity until 12 October 1955. Gerstenberg died of tuberculosis.

Awards and decorations
 Iron Cross (1914)
 2nd Class
 1st Class
 Wound Badge (1914)
 in Black
 Knight's Cross of the Royal House Order of Hohenzollern with Swords
 Honour Cross of the World War 1914/1918
 Order of Michael the Brave
 3rd Class (3 March 1943)

References

External links
 Short biography
 Italian biography with details about the role of Gerstenberg during King Michael coup (translated)
Overview of military career 

 2009-10-25

Bibliography
 Hillgruber, Andreas (1965):  Hitler, König Carol und Marschall Antonescu: die deutsch-rumänischen Beziehungen 1938–1944, Wiesbaden: Steiner.

1893 births
1959 deaths
German Army personnel of World War I
People from Garmisch-Partenkirchen (district)
Luftwaffe World War II generals
German prisoners of war in World War II held by the Soviet Union
People from the Kingdom of Bavaria
Prussian Army personnel
Luftstreitkräfte personnel
Reichswehr personnel
20th-century deaths from tuberculosis
Recipients of the Order of Michael the Brave
Lieutenant generals of the Luftwaffe
Tuberculosis deaths in Germany